Musapur is an agricultural village in the Shaheed Bhagat Singh Nagar district of Punjab in India.

Villages in Shaheed Bhagat Singh Nagar district